Ayatollah Mirza Mohammad Hassan Ahmadi Faghih (Persian:  ميرزا محمد حسن احمدى فقيه) (born 1951 - died August 28, 2010 ) was an Iranian Twelver Shi'a Marja.

He studied in seminaries of Qum, Iran under Grand Ayatollah Mohammad-Reza Golpaygani and Mohammad Ali Araki. He was the husband of mujtaheda Zohreh Sefati.

See also
List of Maraji
List of deceased Maraji

Notes

External links
Official website

Iranian grand ayatollahs
Iranian Islamists
Shia Islamists
2010 deaths
1951 births
Road incident deaths in Iran